Thomas Mason (28 July 1818 – 11 June 1903) was a New Zealand quaker, runholder, horticulturalist and Member of Parliament.

Biography

He was born in York, Yorkshire, England, on 28 July 1818. He attended Bootham School, York.

He was chairman of both the Wellington Botanic Garden Board and Hutt County Council. Mason Street in the Lower Hutt suburb of Moera was named after him.

His daughter, Elizabeth Catherine Mason, was the mother of Thomas Wilford. Mason died at his home in the Hutt and was buried at Taita Cemetery.

In 2012 the New Zealand International Arts Festival premiered the opera Hōhepa composed by Jenny McLeod about the relationship between Mason and Māori chief Hōhepa Te Umuroa. The opera is set in the Hutt Valley where they met and also Tasmania, Australia.

References

1818 births
1903 deaths
People educated at Bootham School
Members of the New Zealand House of Representatives
New Zealand farmers
New Zealand horticulturists
Unsuccessful candidates in the 1887 New Zealand general election
Unsuccessful candidates in the 1884 New Zealand general election
New Zealand MPs for Hutt Valley electorates
English emigrants to New Zealand
19th-century New Zealand politicians
New Zealand Quakers
Burials at Taitā Lawn Cemetery